The Bank of Italy in Tracy, California, also known as the Old Bank of America Building, the American Bank of Tracy, and the Kagehiro Building, is a historic bank building completed in 1919. It was added to the National Register of Historic Places in 1985.

History 

The Bank of Italy building is a two-story brick commercial structure with a second-story window arcade.   It was completed in 1919. It cost $35,000 to build at the time and is still intact.

Originally, the building was the American Bank of Tracy, founded by Philip Fabian and Abe Grunauer. In 1921, the building was purchased and became a branch of A. P. Giannini's Bank of Italy, and subsequently Bank of America.

See also
Bank of Italy (United States)

References

		
National Register of Historic Places in San Joaquin County, California
Renaissance Revival architecture in California
Buildings and structures completed in 1919